Combinatul de Industrializare a Lemnului Sighetu Marmației, commonly known as CIL Sighetu Marmației, was a Romanian football club based in Sighetu Marmației, being one of the top teams of the Maramureș County during the Communist regime, alongside FC Baia Mare and Minerul Cavnic.

History

Early days 

In 1936, along with the foundation of Liga III, it was created the first football club from Sighetu Marmației, named Maramureșul. After the dissolution of the third tier of Romanian football, Maramureșul continued to play in regional football leagues.

When the Second World War ended, the team was renamed Tisa Sighet, after the river Tisa, which separates Sighet from Solotvyno village found in Ukraine. After the best Liga III season since foundation, the team won the promotion to Liga II, but relegates after just one season back to the third tier, being renamed C.F.R..

After another season, Liga III was again dissolved, but, after six years, the competition was re-founded and the Sighet-based team played again under a new name : Recolta. In the following years, the team is renamed several times: Tisa, then Stăruința and Foresta.

In 1966, the team, under the name Forestiera Sighet, relegates into Liga IV.

C.I.L. Sighet 

At the end of 1967–68 season, the team wins the promotion to Liga III, changing for the last time its name, to CIL Sighetu Marmației, after the wood-processing factory based in the town.

The 1974–75 season saw CIL Sighet winning the Liga III 10th group and the promotion to Liga II for the second time. The first Liga II season after twenty-seven years seals the club's best performance ever: the fifth position in the Romanian second tier. After only three seasons, the team relegates again to Liga III, but gains the promotion after only a season.

The team spends another three seasons in Liga II, relegating at the end of 1983–84 season and promoting again after another year, when it played for the first time in the third league against another Sighet-based team: ISSM Sighetu Marmației. After the 1990–91 season, the team relegates for the last time to Liga III.

Dissolution 

After the Romanian Revolution, which sealed the fall of communism, the team lost its financial support and struggled to survive for a year and a half. In 1990, the team won the promotion to Liga II, but after only a season, in 1991, CIL relegated to the third league. At the beginning of 1991–92 season, CIL Sighet, alongside Oaşul Negrești-Oaș and Rapid Jibou, retired from the championship and disappeared.

Notable players
 Grigore Arezanov
 Vasile Caciureac

 Iosif Roman

Notable Managers

References 

Association football clubs established in 1936
Association football clubs disestablished in 1991
Defunct football clubs in Romania
Football clubs in Maramureș County
Liga II clubs
Liga III clubs
1936 establishments in Romania
1991 disestablishments in Romania